The War Is Over (-1966) is a French drama film about a leftist in Franco's Spain, directed by Alain Resnais and starring Yves Montand, Ingrid Thulin and Geneviève Bujold. Joseph Losey directed a sequel, Roads to the South (-1978). In July 2021, the film was shown in the Cannes Classics section at the 2021 Cannes Film Festival.

Plot
In the aftermath of the Spanish Civil War, communist veteran Diego has dedicated his life to continuing the struggle against the Francoist State while he lives in exile in Paris. Lately, however, he has become war-weary and skeptical about the tactics of the extremist underground.

After meeting Nadine by using her father's passport, Diego learns that she is involved with an alternative extremist group that is planning an armed attack in Spain. When he meets the young extremists who will execute the plan, he tries to persuade them to abandon the action as misconceived, but they ignore him. The leaders of the underground send Diego on a mission to Barcelona along with a new recruit, perhaps as a way of getting rid of him as the police have since discovered his identity. His lover Marianne, who has received a warning from Nadine, attempts to intercept him before he is arrested.

Cast
 Yves Montand : Diego Mora
 Ingrid Thulin : Marianne
 Geneviève Bujold : Nadine Sallanches
 Jean Dasté : Chief
 Michel Piccoli : First Customs Inspector
 Anouk Ferjac : Marie Jude
 Paul Crauchet : Roberto
 Laurence Badie : Bernadette Pluvier
 Françoise Bertin : Carmen
 Yvette Etiévant : Yvette
 Jean Bouise : Ramon
 Claire Duhamel : Traveller 1
 Antoine Bourseiller : Traveller 2

Accolades
The film was nominated for an Oscar for its script and won the New York Film Critics Circle award for Best Foreign Language Film.

References

External links
 

1967 films
1960s political drama films
1960s French-language films
Films directed by Alain Resnais
Films set in France
Films set in Spain
French political drama films
Louis Delluc Prize winners
Spanish Civil War films
Films produced by Anatole Dauman
Films scored by Giovanni Fusco
1966 drama films
1966 films
1967 drama films
1960s French films